Arzu may refer to:

Films
 Arzu (1961 film), a 1961 Turkish film
 Arzu (1976 film), a 1976 Turkish film
 Arzu (1979 film), a 1979 Turkish film

Places
 Arzu, Khachmaz, a village and municipality in the Khachmaz Rayon of Azerbaijan
 Alternate name of Arzuiyeh, a city in Kerman Province, Iran
 Alternate name of Orzu, Iran, a village in Iran

Other uses
 Arzu (name), a feminine Turkish given name
 Arzu (footballer) (born 1981), Spanish footballer
 ARZU TV, an Afghan satellite TV network